Arielle Leah Ship (born May 2, 1995) is an American soccer player who plays as a forward for Kansas City in the National Women's Soccer League (NWSL). She was the recipient of the California Golden Bears' first ever Pac-12 Player of the Year Award in 2015.

Career
Ship was drafted by Seattle Reign FC in the 2017 NWSL College Draft.

She was traded along with a 2018 draft pick to the Washington Spirit in exchange for Diana Matheson. On August 8, 2017, Ship was named NWSL Player of the Week after scoring a goal and adding two assists in a Spirit 4–1 win over Sky Blue FC. On August 26, 2017, Ship suffered a torn right ACL during a game against the Chicago Red Stars and would miss the remainder of the 2017 season. In 2022, she left the Kansas City Current and joined the Swedish team IFK Kalmar.

References

External links
California Golden Bears bio
Pac-12 Player of the Year
 

1995 births
Living people
American women's soccer players
California Golden Bears women's soccer players
National Women's Soccer League players
OL Reign draft picks
People from Westlake Village, California
Soccer players from California
Sportspeople from Los Angeles County, California
Sportspeople from Ventura County, California
Washington Spirit players
Women's association football forwards
Utah Royals FC players
Kansas City Current players